Bhawal Badre Alam Government College, is a government educational institution located in Gazipur district of Bangladesh, popularly known as Bhawal College. It is located along Dhaka-Tangail highway near Gazipur intersection. It was established in 1967 and was declared a government college in 1980. The founder of the college was Mr. Badre Alam and the first principal of the college was Mr. K. M. Abdus Salam

History
Bhawal Badre Alam Government College was established on 1 July 1967 as Bhawal College. It was renamed after Badare Alam, who had donated 100 thousand rupees to the college.

In December 2014 the Government imposed section 144, curfew, on the grounds of Bhawal College after the Bangladesh Nationalist Party called a rally in support of their movement towards a snap election and the Bangladesh Chhatra League announced plans to stop that rally.

On 29 July 2017, the National University examination centre was shifted out of Bhawal College, without any prior notice, so that a local Awami League could hold a rally in Bhawal College.

Academic Information

College Code = 2125 (HSC)
College Code = 5501 (National University)
EIIN No = 109031(Education Ministry)

Department

Chemistry

Physics

Mathematics

Botany

Zoology

References

External links
 http://www.bbagc.edu.bd

Colleges affiliated to National University, Bangladesh
Universities and colleges in Gazipur
1967 establishments in Pakistan